Ras Baalbek is a village in the northern Beqaa Valley in Lebanon.

History
Ras Baalbek is 500 metres west of a Neolithic rock shelter called Ras Baalbek I.

To the east there are ruins that are alleged to be the remains of a Roman aqueduct. Inhabitants of the village have confirmed it was once called "Connaya," suggesting a link to the ancient settlement of Conna, mentioned in the work of Antonius. 
Notable features include the monastery of "Our Lady of Ras Baalbek" (Deir Saidat ar-Ras)  and two Byzantine churches. One church is in the centre of the village and the other lies by the Roman aqueduct.

In 1838, Eli Smith noted Ras Baalbek's population as being predominantly  Catholic Christian.

In 2014, the war with ISIS in the nearby village of Arsal resulted in the residents of Ras Baalbek forming a militia to protect the village. The militias were allied to the Lebanese Armed Forces. In September 2016 the Lebanese Army attacked Islamic State positions near Ras Baalbek.

Demographics
Around 15,000 people live in Ras Baalbek. The population is entirely Christian, mainly Roman Catholic, having switched from Orthodox Christianity in 1721.

The village is fashion designer Zuhair Murad's hometown.

References

Bibliography

External links
 Ras Baalbek website
 Ras Baalbek
 

Populated places in Baalbek District
Great Rift Valley
Coloniae (Roman)
Populated places established in the 6th millennium BC
Melkite Christian communities in Lebanon